Sir Charles Brian Blagden FRS (17 April 1748 – 26 March 1820) was an English physician and chemist. He served as a medical officer in the Army (1776–1780) and later held the position of Secretary of the Royal Society (1784–1797).  Blagden won the Copley Medal in 1788 and was knighted in 1792.

He died in Arcueil, France in 1820, and was buried at Père Lachaise Cemetery in Paris.

Science

In June 1783, Blagden, then assistant to Henry Cavendish, visited Antoine Lavoisier in Paris and described how Cavendish had created water by burning "inflammable air". Lavoisier's dissatisfaction with the Cavendish's "dephlogistinization" theory led him to the concept of a chemical reaction, which he reported to the Royal Academy of Sciences on 24 June 1783, effectively founding modern chemistry. He was elected a Foreign Honorary Member of the American Academy of Arts and Sciences in 1789. He was elected to the American Philosophical Society in 1789.

Blagden experimented on human ability to withstand high temperatures. In 1775 he showed that human beings could withstand room temperatures as high as 260 degrees Fahrenheit (127 degrees Celsius).. In his report to the Royal Society in 1775, he was first Western scientist to officially recognise the role of perspiration in thermoregulation.

Blagden's experiments on how dissolved substances like salt affected the freezing point of water led to the discovery that the freezing point of a solution decreases in direct proportion to the concentration of the solution, now called Blagden's Law.

References

Further reading

External links
 Blagden Papers at the Royal Society
 National Public Radio story about Blagden's experiment in a hot room
 Sir Charles Blagden Papers. James Marshall and Marie-Louise Osborn Collection, Beinecke Rare Book and Manuscript Library, Yale University.

1748 births
1820 deaths
Fellows of the Royal Society
Recipients of the Copley Medal
19th-century English medical doctors
18th-century English medical doctors
19th-century English chemists
18th-century English chemists
Fellows of the American Academy of Arts and Sciences
People from Wotton-under-Edge
Burials at Père Lachaise Cemetery